My Friends Tigger & Pooh is an American computer-animated children's television series on Disney Channel as part of the Playhouse Disney block, inspired by A. A. Milne's Winnie-the-Pooh. The series was developed by Walt Disney Television Animation and executive produced by Brian Hohlfeld. The series aired from May 12, 2007 to October 9, 2010 in the United States,

Overview 
The series featured Pooh and other characters from the book and prior film and television adaptations and introduces two new characters: an imaginative 6-year-old red-headed girl named Darby and her dog Buster. Darby is the main protagonist and an amateur sleuth. Her older best friend is Christopher Robin, who has grown up and makes two appearances over the course of the series. Darby teams up with Winnie the Pooh and Tigger to form the trio of Super Sleuths, and they investigate mysteries in the Hundred Acre Wood.

Episodes

Voice cast

Major
 Chloë Grace Moretz as Darby
 Dee Bradley Baker as Buster
 Jim Cummings as Winnie-the-Pooh, and Tigger

Recurring
 Travis Oates as Piglet
 Peter Cullen as Eeyore
 Ken Sansom as Rabbit
 Kath Soucie as Kanga
 Max Burkholder as Roo
 Oliver Dillon as Lumpy
 Brenda Blethyn as Mama Heffalump

Minor
 Tara Strong as Porcupine and Vixen
 Rob Paulsen as Raccoon
 James Arnold Taylor as Skunk
 Mark Hamill as Turtle
 Sydney Saylor as Possums
 Dee Bradley Baker as Woodpecker
 Struan Erlenborn as Christopher Robin
 Jim Cummings as Beaver

Production and broadcast 
Developed by Walt Disney Television Animation with animation from Japanese company Polygon Pictures, My Friends Tigger & Pooh was executive produced and story edited by Brian Hohlfeld. It premiered on Disney Channel's Playhouse Disney block on May 12, 2007.  The series was renewed for a second season in June 2007. After voicing him in Pooh's Heffalump Halloween Movie, Travis Oates reprised the role of Piglet, taking over for John Fiedler, who died on June 25, 2005, two years prior to the debut of the series. It also marked the final time Peter Cullen, Ken Sansom and Kath Soucie provided the respective voices of Eeyore, Rabbit and Kanga, as all three of them would be recast in 2011's Winnie the Pooh and Sansom died the following year. Cullen would later reprise Eeyore in the 2017 Doc McStuffins special "Into the Hundred Acre Wood". It was renewed for a 35-episode third season in March 2008.

DVD releases 

 The Many Adventures of Winnie the Pooh: Friendship Edition (June 19, 2007)
Rabbit's Ruta-Wakening / Tigger's Shadow of a Doubt
 Super Sleuth Christmas Movie (November 20, 2007)
Super Sleuth Christmas Movie
Symphony for a Rabbit / Tigger Goes Snowflaky
 Friendly Tails (March 4, 2008)
Darby, Solo Sleuth / Doggone Buster
Darby's Tail / Tigger's Delivery Service
Pooh-Rates of the Hundred Acre Wood / Tigger's Hiccup Pickup
 Hundred Acre Wood Haunt (September 2, 2008)
Super-Sized Darby / Piglet's Lightning Frightening
Eeyore's Trip to the Moon / The Incredible Shrinking Roo
Eeyore's Home Sweet Home / Rabbit's Prized Pumpkin
 Tigger & Pooh and a Musical Too (April 7, 2009)
Tigger & Pooh and a Musical Too
 Super Duper Super Sleuths (April 6, 2010)
Super Duper Super Sleuths
Darby Gets Lemons, Makes Lemonade / Dancing with Darby
 Bedtime with Pooh (August 17, 2010)
Eeyore's Sad Day / Tigger's Bedtime for Bouncer
Buster's Bath / Once in a Pooh Moon
Pooh's Double Trouble / Eeyore Sleeps on It

Reception 
My Friends Tigger & Pooh was the number 1-ranked television series in kids 2–5 during its first season, earning a 5.2 rating. It also ranked as the top kid series with women 18–49 (0.7 rating), according to Disney Channel. The series continued to be the top-ranked show in kids 2–5 during its second season.

Marilyn Moss of Associated Press reviewed the show favorably, calling it "a charming series", adding that the "animation is splendid, and, of course, the characters retain their charm".

The series and Brian Hohlfield won a Humanitas Award for its first season segment, "Eeyore’s Sad Day". Further, the series was nominated for six Daytime Emmy Awards in 2008 and 2009, three for each year.

References

External links

 
 
 My Friends Tigger & Pooh Review at KidsTVMovies.About.com

2007 American television series debuts
2010 American television series endings
2000s American animated television series
2010s American animated television series
2000s preschool education television series
2010s preschool education television series
American animated television spin-offs
American children's animated adventure television series
American children's animated fantasy television series
American children's animated musical television series
American children's animated mystery television series
American computer-animated television series
American detective television series
American preschool education television series
American television shows based on children's books
Animated preschool education television series
Animated television series about bears
Animated television series about children
Disney Channel original programming
Disney Junior original programming
English-language television shows
Television series based on Disney films
Television series by Disney Television Animation
Winnie the Pooh (franchise)
Winnie-the-Pooh television series